The 1936 Virginia Cavaliers football team represented the University of Virginia during the 1936 college football season. The Cavaliers were led by third-year head coach Gus Tebell and played their home games at Scott Stadium in Charlottesville, Virginia. They competed as members of the Southern Conference, finishing with a conference record of 1–5 and a 2–7 record overall. Shortly after the season ended, Virginia decided to leave the Southern Conference in response to the conference's "Graham Plan" that prohibited sports scholarships. In February 1937, head coach Gus Tebell was replaced by former Marquette head coach Frank Murray. Tebell failed to produce a winning season in his three years at Virginia and had an overall record of 6–18–4. He remained at the school to coach the basketball and baseball teams.

Schedule

References

Virginia
Virginia Cavaliers football seasons
Virginia Cavaliers football